Faten Mahmoud is a Minister of State for Women's Affairs in the cabinet of Iraqi Prime Minister Nouri al-Maliki.  She is one of five female members of the Cabinet.

References

Government ministers of Iraq
Living people
21st-century Iraqi women politicians
21st-century Iraqi politicians
Women government ministers of Iraq
Year of birth missing (living people)
Place of birth missing (living people)